"Shockwave" is a song featured on American electronic music producer and DJ Marshmello's 4th album Shockwave. It was released on June 11, 2021 via Joytime Collective/Geffen Records.

Background
"Shockwave" is the last track of the album. Matt Sierra of EDM Tunes commented that the track "blends the old school Marshmello sound, with some vocals, and some grit".

Charts

Weekly charts

Year-end charts

References

2021 songs
Marshmello songs